Pentacosmodon is a mammal genus from the Paleocene of North America, so it lived somewhat after the "age of the dinosaurs". It was a member of the extinct order Multituberculata. It's within the suborder Cimolodonta and family Microcosmodontidae.

The genus Pentacosmodon, named by Jepsen in 1940, is known from the species Pentacosmodon pronus. Fossil remains of this animal have been found in strata dating to the Upper Paleocene of Wyoming (United States) and the Porcupine Hills Formation near the Bow River of Alberta, Canada. This genus was previously placed within family Djadochtatherioidea.

References 
 Jepsen (1940), "Paleocene faunas of the Polecat Bench Formation, Park County, Wyoming." Proc. of the Am. Philos. Soc. 83, p. 217-341.
 Kielan-Jaworowska Z. & Hurum J.H. (2001), "Phylogeny and Systematics of multituberculate mammals." Paleontology 44, p. 389-429.
 Much of this information has been derived from  MESOZOIC MAMMALS: Eucosmodontidae, Microcosmodontidae and Taeniolabidoidea, an Internet directory.

Cimolodonts
Paleocene mammals
Paleocene genus extinctions
Extinct mammals of North America
Fossil taxa described in 1940
Prehistoric mammal genera